Peter Turck often misspelled Turek (1798 - ?) was a farmer from Mequon, Wisconsin who served a single one-year term as a member of the Wisconsin State Assembly.

Background 
When Turck joined the Assembly in January 1849, he was reported to be 50 years old, from New York state, and to have been in Wisconsin for eleven years.

Public affairs 
On June 15, 1841, Turck was designated as a delegate from Washington County to the upcoming Whig territorial convention.

In March 1842, Turck was appointed by James Duane Doty, Whig governor of Wisconsin Territory, as a justice of the peace for Washington County (which at that time included a larger territory, including what is now Ozaukee County. Turck was elected in 1848 to represent the 3rd Washington County Assembly district (the Towns of Mequon and Germantown) as a Democrat, succeeding fellow Democrat Adolphus Zimmermann, for the 1849 term (2nd Wisconsin Legislature). He would not be elected in 1850, but all the Assemblymen from Washington County in 1850 were Democrats.

Later life 
There was a Peter Turck who was politically active in nearby Milwaukee in the 1850s, but there is no evidence whether this was the same person; nor whether he was the same Peter Turck whose insanity embroiled him in a lawsuit in Milwaukee in February 1868.

References 

1798 births
Democratic Party members of the Wisconsin State Assembly
People from Mequon, Wisconsin
People from New York (state)
Farmers from Wisconsin
Wisconsin Whigs
Year of death missing